In the 2006–07 season, USM Alger competed in the Division 1 for the 27th time, as well as the CAF Champions League and the Algerian Cup. It is their 12th consecutive season in the top flight of Algerian football.. USM Alger, who has been discreet in the league this season but still finishing at a qualifying place in an international competition.

Competitions

Overview

Division 1

League table

Results summary

Results by round

Matches

Algerian Cup

Champions League

First round

Squad information

Playing statistics

Appearances (Apps.) numbers are for appearances in competitive games only including sub appearances
Red card numbers denote:   Numbers in parentheses represent red cards overturned for wrongful dismissal.

Goalscorers
Includes all competitive matches. The list is sorted alphabetically by surname when total goals are equal.

Clean sheets
Includes all competitive matches.

Squad list
Players and squad numbers last updated on 31 July 2006.Note: Flags indicate national team as has been defined under FIFA eligibility rules. Players may hold more than one non-FIFA nationality.

Transfers

In

Out

References

USM Alger seasons
Algerian football clubs 2006–07 season